Bord Gáis Energy is a utility that supplies gas and electricity and boiler services to customers in the Republic of Ireland. Bord Gáis Energy has been in operation in some form since 1976 and supplies over 750,000 customers with energy in Ireland. Since mid-2014 Bord Gáis Energy is also part of the British Centrica plc Group. Bord Gáis Energy has offices in Dublin and Cork as well as having boiler service technicians nationwide. Bord Gáis translates as "Gas Board", although is now a private company limited by shares and part of Centrica plc which also owns British Gas.

History 
Beginning in the early 2000s Ireland's state owned public utilities underwent a major reform, following the creation of the Commission for Energy Regulation. This was part of an effort at both Irish and European level to open up electricity and gas markets and end national monopolies through the separation of customer supply and transmission within public utilities. Bord Gáis Éireann was therefore obliged to open up to competition and allow other firms access to their gas network. As part of this effort Bord Gáis Éireann was split into two main business streams Transmission and Distribution and Energy Supply.

The Gas Directive requires that, in the case of vertically integrated utilities such as Bord Gáis, the Transmission System Operator (TSO) and the Distribution System Operator (DSO) functions to be legally and functionally unbundled from activities not related to these functions, although a combined DSO/TSO is permissible. Therefore, a new independent subsidiary, Gaslink, has been established to fulfil the functions of the Irish TSO and DSO and will gradually take over much of the operations of gas Networks Ireland.

Deregulation of the Irish electricity market 
On 18 February 2009, Bord Gáis Energy entered the residential market, joining Airtricity and ESB Customer Supply. The market was deregulated in 2007.

Sale of Bord Gáis Energy 
A condition of the EU/IMF bailout programme for Ireland required the Irish government to sell off some state owned assets to help pay down loans and reduce Ireland's debt burden. In February 2012 it was announced by the Irish government announced it would sell Bord Gáis Energy as required under the bailout terms.

In March 2014 Bord Gáis Éireann confirmed it would sell its customer supply arm Bord Gáis Energy to a consortium made up of Centrica, Brookfield Renewable Energy and iCON Infrastructure to the value of €1.1 billion. The sale involved the splitting of the group's retail unit among the three buyers. The main retail division would be bought by Centrica, while its wind assets under SWS would be acquired by Brookfield Renewable Energy Partners and iCON infrastructure acquiring Northern Ireland based Firmus Energy. Bord Gáis Éireann was subsequently renamed Ervia.

Today Bord Gáis Energy is a private limited company that is part of the Centrica Group and no longer associated in any way with Ervia or any of its subsidiaries (Irish Water or Gas Networks Ireland).

Sponsorships 
BGE has a number of sponsorship programmes including the Bord Gáis Energy Theatre, Bord Gáis Energy Book Club and Irish Book Awards, Bord Gáis Energy Student Theatre Awards and the Bord Gáis Energy GAA U21 All Ireland U21 Hurling Championship.

Services 
Bord Gáis Energy is predominantly a supply company, but also offer a range of gas boiler maintenance services to customers.

See also 

 Bord Gais Energy Theatre, or BGET
 United Kingdom–Ireland natural gas interconnectors

References 

Energy companies established in 1976
Energy companies of the Republic of Ireland
Irish companies established in 1976